Rocquencourt refers to two places in France:

 Rocquencourt, Yvelines
 Rocquencourt, Oise